Nation University originally called ‘Yonok College’ was granted by the Ministry of University Affairs to start teaching in 1988 and operated by Yonok Foundation. Yonok College was granted by the Office of the Higher Education Commission to change the type from college to become ‘Yonok University’ on 23 August 2006 and later on 30 November 2011 the Ministry of Education as suggested by the Higher Education Commission permitted to change the name to ‘Nation University.’

The university has taught bachelor degrees and Master’s degrees levels for 32 years (1988-2020 A.D.) and has more than 8.444 graduates divided into 6,907 bachelor degrees and 1,537 Master’s degrees.

Nation University is a private higher educational institute in Lampang province that has taught for more than 32 years (1988-2020 A.D.) with more than 8.444 graduates. At present, the university manages curriculums covering the areas of health sciences, sciences and technologies, humanities and social sciences in the following curriculums:

1) Doctor of Dental Surgery

2) Bachelor of Science Program in Medical Technology

3) Bachelor of Nursing Science

4) Bachelor of Public Health Program in Public Health

5) Bachelor of Business Administration (Aviation Business and Air Transportation)

6) Bachelor of Business Administration

7) Bachelor of Accountancy

8) Bachelor of Public Administration Program in Public Administration

9) Bachelor of Science (Computer Science)

10) Bachelor of Communications Arts

11) Master of Business Administration

12) Master of education program in Educational Administration

The university commits to produce quality graduates for the society with the teaching and learning process that makes the students thinkers, thirst to learn in academic with activity applications to allow students to gain true experiences and be able to use the knowledge in working efficiently.

The university has beautiful natural landscape with academic atmosphere supporting learning and university living as an ‘educational park’ with close nurturing from the learned faculty members including other facilities such as libraries, male dormitories, woman dormitories, computer and scientific laboratories ready to provide services for teaching and learning and researches.

The university is located at No. 444 Village No. 2, Vajiravuth Damnern Road, Prabat sub-district, Mueang district, Lampang province, Thailand.

See also
 List of universities in Thailand

External links 
 

Universities in Thailand
Educational institutions established in 1988
1988 establishments in Thailand